Jorge Carpizo McGregor (2 April 1944 – 30 March 2012) was a Mexican jurist who occupied various high rank positions in the government of Mexico.

Carpizo was the son of Óscar Carpizo Berrón and Luz María McGregor Dondé. He received a bachelor's degree in law from the National Autonomous University of Mexico (UNAM), a master's degree in law from the London School of Economics and a doctorate in law from the UNAM.

From January 1985 to January 1989, Carpizo McGregor served as Rector of the National Autonomous University of Mexico. In the late 1980s he served as Minister Chief Justice of the  Supreme Court of Justice of the Nation. In June 1990 he was appointed president of the National Human Rights Commission (the first ombudsman in Mexico). In 1993 President Carlos Salinas de Gortari designated him Attorney General, and he later became Secretary of the Interior. In the following administration, President Ernesto Zedillo designated him Ambassador to France.

References

External links
 Profile at the UNAM website.

1944 births
2012 deaths
20th-century Mexican judges
Mexican people of Scottish descent
Mexican Secretaries of the Interior
Presidents of the National Human Rights Commission (Mexico)
Supreme Court of Justice of the Nation justices
Ambassadors of Mexico to France
Politicians from Campeche City
National Autonomous University of Mexico alumni
Alumni of the London School of Economics
Attorneys general of Mexico
20th-century Mexican politicians